South Korea competed at the 2011 World Aquatics Championships in Shanghai, China between July 16 and 31, 2011.

Medalists

Swimming

South Korea qualified 18 swimmers.

Men

Women

Synchronised swimming

South Korea has qualified 2 athletes in synchronised swimming.

Women

References

2011 in South Korean sport
Nations at the 2011 World Aquatics Championships
South Korea at the World Aquatics Championships